Polycera marplatensis is a species of sea slug, a nudibranch, a shell-less marine gastropod mollusc in the family Polyceridae.

Distribution 
This species was described from Mar del Plata, Buenos Aires, Argentina, . It has been reported from Brazil to Patagonia.

Ecology
Polycera marplatensis is common in the intertidal zone where it feeds on the Bryozoan Bugula sp..

References

Polyceridae
Gastropods described in 1928